Sweet Pandemonium may refer to:
"Sweet Pandemonium", a song by the Fixx on the album Happy Landings and Lost Tracks, 2001
"Sweet Pandemonium", a song by HIM on the album Love Metal, 2003